The 1995 Palo Verde derailment took place on October 9, 1995, when Amtrak's Sunset Limited was derailed by saboteurs near Palo Verde, Arizona on Southern Pacific Railroad tracks. Two locomotives, Amtrak GE P32-8BWH #511 leading and EMD F40PHR #398 trailing, and eight of twelve cars derailed, four of them falling 30 feet (9 m) off a trestle bridge into a dry river bed. Mitchell Bates, a sleeping car attendant, was killed. Seventy-eight people were injured, 12 of them seriously and 25 were hospitalized.

Incident

Four typewritten notes, attacking the ATF and the FBI for the 1993 Waco Siege, criticizing local law enforcement, and signed "Sons of the Gestapo", were found near the scene of the wreck, indicating that the train had been sabotaged. All four notes were similar. Two of the notes were found by Neal Hallford, a passenger traveling from Oklahoma to San Diego.

It was found that the rails had been shifted out of position to cause the derailment, but only after they had been connected with wires. This kept the track circuit closed, circumventing safety systems designed to warn locomotive engineers of track problems, and suggested that the saboteurs had a working knowledge of railroads. The attack was likened to the 1939 wreck of the City of San Francisco, in which a similar method killed 24 people.

Following the incident, Amtrak President Thomas Downs told CNN that improved monitoring and security measures have greatly reduced the chances of a similar incident. 

The saboteurs were never identified. 

After 1996, the Sunset Limited was rerouted to south of Phoenix (approaching no closer than Maricopa) due to the desire of Union Pacific to abandon this stretch of track (leading to and through Phoenix, AZ) for its through trains between southern New Mexico and southern California. The section of track on which the derailment took place is now used as storage track only. It could be reactivated in the future if freight traffic increases.

Media coverage
The causes of this wreck have been explored in two major documentaries, Why Trains Crash: Blood on the Tracks, and Derailed: America's Worst Train Wrecks.

It has also been featured on the May 10, 1996, episode of Unsolved Mysteries.

Investigation
The case remains unsolved. On April 10, 2015, the Phoenix office of the FBI announced a reward of $310,000 for information about the derailment leading to the capture of those responsible. The reward was still outstanding .

See also

List of unsolved murders
Oklahoma City bombing

References

External links

Amtrak - Federal Bureau of Investigation

1995 in Arizona
1995 murders in the United States
Accidents and incidents involving Amtrak
Accidents and incidents involving Southern Pacific Railroad
Attacks in the United States in 1995
Derailments in the United States
Events in Maricopa County, Arizona
Male murder victims
October 1995 events in the United States
October 1995 crimes
Railway accidents and incidents in Arizona
Railway accidents in 1995
Terrorist incidents by unknown perpetrators
Terrorist incidents in the United States in 1995
Train wrecks caused by sabotage
Unsolved murders in the United States